Berkh  is a town in the Batnorov sum (district) of Khentii Province in eastern Mongolia.

Population 
Berkh population is 3,890 (end of 2006).

Economy 
The fluorspar mine is in the town.

There are 42,000 heads of livestock in Berh, but they don't have enough pasture land.

References 

Populated places in Mongolia